Blueprint for Disaster is a Canadian documentary television series that premiered in 2004 on Discovery Channel Canada. Produced by Temple Street Productions, the program investigates why and how various disasters have happened. Toronto-based Voice Artist Adrian Bell provided the narration for the first series. The show also aired in the UK under the title Seconds from Disaster. , two seasons have been produced.

Episodes

Season 1

Season 2

See also
Seconds from Disaster
Seismic Seconds
Mayday
Trapped

References

External links
 by the Discovery Channel
 Temple Street Productions

2000s Canadian documentary television series
2004 Canadian television series debuts
2008 Canadian television series endings
Discovery Channel (Canada) original programming
Documentary films about disasters
Science docudramas
Television series by Temple Street Productions